Leslie Sierra Jamison (born June 21, 1983) is an American novelist and essayist. She is the author of the 2010 novel The Gin Closet and the 2014 essay collection The Empathy Exams. Jamison also directs the non-fiction concentration in writing at Columbia University's School of the Arts.

Early life 
Jamison was born in Washington, D.C. and raised in the Pacific Palisades neighborhood of Los Angeles. Her parents are Joanne Leslie, a nutritionist and former professor of public health, and economist and global health researcher Dean Jamison; Leslie Jamison is the niece of clinical psychologist and writer Kay Redfield Jamison. Jamison grew up with two older brothers. Her parents divorced when she was 11, after which Jamison lived with her mother.

Jamison attended Harvard College, where she majored in English, and graduated in 2004. Her senior thesis dealt with incest in the work of William Faulkner. While an undergraduate, she won the Edward Eager Memorial Fund prize in creative writing, an award also won by classmate, writer Uzodimna Iweala. Jamison was a member of the college literary magazine The Advocate and social club The Signet Society.

Jamison then attended the Iowa Writers' Workshop, where she earned an MFA in fiction, as well as Yale University where she earned a Ph.D. in English literature. At Yale, Jamison worked with Wai Chee Dimock, Amy Hungerford, and Caleb Smith, submitting a dissertation entitled "The Recovered: Addiction and Sincerity in 20th Century American Literature" in May 2016.

Career 
Jamison's work has been published in Best New American Voices 2008, A Public Space, The New York Review of Books, and Black Warrior Review.

Books 

Jamison's first novel, The Gin Closet, was published by Free Press in 2010. Jamison has described the book as the account of a "young New Yorker [who] goes looking for an aunt she’s never met...and finds her drinking herself to death in a Nevada trailer. They end up building a precarious but deeply invested life together, trying...to save each other’s lives." It received positive reviews by the San Francisco Chronicle, Vogue, and Publishers Weekly.

Jamison's second book, The Empathy Exams, an essay collection published by Graywolf Press, debuted in April 2014 at number 11 on the New York Times bestseller list. The book received wide acclaim from critics,<ref>{{Cite news|url=https://www.bostonglobe.com/arts/books/2014/04/06/book-review-the-empathy-exams-leslie-jamison/67IY4MbjcZSBFkv52jX6wM/story.html|title=Book review: "The Empathy Exams by Leslie Jamison|last=Tuttle|first=Kate|date=April 7, 2014|work=The Boston Globe|access-date=2018-01-18|archive-url=https://web.archive.org/web/20140413111953/http://www.bostonglobe.com/arts/books/2014/04/06/book-review-the-empathy-exams-leslie-jamison/67IY4MbjcZSBFkv52jX6wM/story.html|archive-date=2014-04-13|url-status=dead}}</ref> with Olivia Lang writing in The New York Times, "It’s hard to imagine a stronger, more thoughtful voice emerging this year." Each essay uses a mixture of journalistic and memoir approaches that combine Jamison's own experiences and that of the people in various communities to explore the empathetic exchange between people.

Jamison's third book, The Recovering: Intoxication and Its Aftermath, was published in April 2018 from Little, Brown. Publishers Weekly describes the book as "unsparing and luminous autobiographical study of alcoholism." It combines Jamison's memoir of her own alcoholism with a survey of others (some of them famous), with a focus on recovery.

Jamison's fourth book, Make It Scream, Make It Burn, was published in September 2019 by Little, Brown. It's a collection of 14 essays on the themes of longing, looking and dwelling.

 Teaching 
In the fall of 2015, Jamison joined the faculty at Columbia University's School of the Arts. She is assistant professor and director of the non-fiction concentration in writing. Jamison also leads a group of Columbia University MFA students in a Creative Writing Workshop at the Marian House, transitional housing for women in recovery.

Personal life
Jamison lives in Park Slope, Brooklyn with a daughter she shares with her ex-husband, the writer Charles Bock. She and Bock divorced in early 2020, shortly before Jamison contracted Covid-19 and went into quarantine with her daughter.

Bibliography

Books
Novels
 The Gin Closet (Free, 2010)
Non-fiction
 The Empathy Exams (Graywolf, 2014)52 Blue (2014)Such Mean Estate (2015)
 The Recovering: Intoxication and its Aftermath (Little, Brown, 2018)
 Make It Scream, Make It Burn (Little, Brown, 2019)

References

Further reading
 

 External links 
 How Doctors Take Women's Pain Less Seriously in The Atlantic – described in an interview in The Empathy Exams''

1983 births
Living people
21st-century American novelists
Writers from California
Iowa Writers' Workshop alumni
American women novelists
21st-century American women writers
Harvard College alumni
Yale University alumni
Columbia University faculty
21st-century essayists
Writers from Brooklyn
Writers from Washington, D.C.
Novelists from New York (state)
American women academics